Clark v. Martinez, 543 U.S. 371 (2005), was a United States Supreme Court case ending the pointless detention of people who had been denied refugee status. They were kept in prison awaiting deportation even though they could not in fact be deported due to a political stalemate with Cuba. An alien can be found inadmissible on the grounds of poor health, criminal history, substance trafficking, prostitution/human trafficking, money laundering, terrorist activity, etc. The deportation process requires a ruling from an immigration judge for violating immigration laws. The case resolved conflicting rulings made by the 9th and 11th circuits on whether Zadvydas v. Davis (2001) was applicable to inadmissible immigrants, Sergio Martinez and Daniel Benitez. The cases of Martinez and Benitez were later consolidated by the Supreme Court.

Zadvydas v. Davis stated that the government can detain admissible and admitted aliens only long enough beyond the 90-day removal period if necessary for deportation. If deportation is unforeseeable then the immigrant must be released. Zadvydas v. Davis fails to define if immigrants inadmissible to the U.S. have these same protections.

The Supreme Court decision (7-2) found that Zadvydas v. Davis was in fact applicable to inadmissible immigrants. In the case of Martinez and Benitez where deportation to Cuba is implausible, further detention is unnecessary. The court however did not grant constitutional protection from indefinite detention to inadmissible immigrants.

History

Cubans Sergio Suarez Martinez and Daniel Benitez gained access to the US in June 1980 via the Mariel Boatlift. By the time they had applied for legal permanent residence through the Cuban Refugee Adjustment Act; which allows Cubans who have been living in the US for a year to apply. Both men, however, had racked up significant criminal charges thus they could not qualify for the adjustment from refugee to legal permanent resident.

"When Martinez sought adjustment in 1991, he had been convicted of assault with a deadly weapon in Rhode Island and burglary in California, Pet. for Cert. in No. 03-878, at 7; when Benitez sought adjustment in 1985, he had been convicted of grand theft in Florida, 337 F. 3d, at 1290. Both men were convicted of additional felonies after their adjustment applications were denied: Martinez of petty theft with a prior conviction (1996), assault with a deadly weapon (1998), and attempted oral copulation by force (1999), see Pet. for Cert. in No. 03-878, at 7-8; Benitez of two counts of armed robbery, armed burglary of a conveyance, armed burglary of a structure, aggravated battery, carrying a concealed firearm, unlawful possession of a firearm while engaged in a criminal offense, and unlawful possession, sale, or delivery of a firearm with an altered serial number (1993), see 337 F. 3d, at 1290-1291."

Both Martinez and Benitez had their parole revoked and faced deportation by Immigration and Naturalization Services (INS). While being detained by INS, Martinez and Benitez, each filed a petition for the writ of habeas corpus to challenge their indefinite detention.

On October 30, 2002, Martinez was granted petition by the United States District Court for the District of Oregon under Martinez v. Smith and was to be released at the digression of INS. Whereas Benitez was denied petition by the United States District Court for the Northern District of Florida under Benitez v. Wallis on July 11, 2002. These contracting interpretations of Zadvydas v. Davis led to the cases being consolidated by the United States Supreme Court.

Mariel Boatlift 1980
The Mariel Boatlift, was a series of boatlifts that took place from April 15 to October 31, 1980. The boatlift was responsible for the transport of 125,000 Cubans from the port of Mariel to southern Florida.  Within this time frame Fidel Castro allowed any Cuban who wanted to leave and had a permit to do so through the Port of Mariel. The United States Coast Guard began to see numerous personal vessels flood out of Key West and Miami, Florida. The first flood out of the U.S. were 20–40 ft pleasure boats belonging to Cuban American's who had relatives in Cuba.  By the 21st, a second flood of Cuban Americans attempting to rent or buy boats came. Not long after their departure for Mariel the Coast Guard began to receive distress calls and several search and rescue mission were required.

Of the 125,000 refugees 2,300 had previous criminal charges in Cuba, under U.S. law 2,746 were considered criminals. Many of the 2,746 criminals that applied for US residency under the 1984 Cuban Refugee Adjustment Act   were declared unfit due to the alien's disciplinary record and criminal record.

Controversy
Much of the controversy came from the ambiguous wording in Zadvydas v. Davis. Zadvydas v. Davis ruled that admissible aliens/ aliens who had already been granted US residency facing deportation may not be detained longer than the 90-day removal period. The use of "may" and "admissible" in the passage below led to confusion for the lower courts.

Justice Anthony Kennedy in dissent in Zadvydas had objected that

The majority's unanchored interpretation ignores another indication that the Attorney General's detention discretion was not limited to this truncated period. Section 1231(a)(6) permits continued detention not only of removable aliens but also of inadmissible aliens, for instance those stopped at the border before entry. Congress provides for detention of both categories within the same statutory grant of authority. Accepting the majority's interpretation, then, there are two possibilities, neither of which is sustainable. On the one hand, it may be that the majority's rule applies to both categories of aliens, in which case we are asked to assume that Congress intended to restrict the discretion it could confer upon the Attorney General so that all inadmissible aliens must be allowed into our community within six months. On the other hand, the majority's logic might be that inadmissible and removable aliens can be treated differently. Yet it is not a plausible construction of § 1231(a)(6) to imply a time limit as to one class but not to another. The text does not admit of this possibility. As a result, it is difficult to see why "[a]liens who have not yet gained initial admission to this country would present a very different question.

Kennedy's objection—that Zadvydas might be read to overturn prior cases and Constitutionally forbid the indefinite detention of aliens seeking "initial admission to this country"—was the question presented in Clark v. Martinez.

Clark v. Martinez also poses the controversial question of where aliens physically are while their status is being determined.

One of the government's tactics has been to deny release to people who are "paroled" into the United States, meaning that they are physically allowed into the country while their status is being determined. Technically, they are not considered to be "in" the country

Aftermath
Martinez was held by INS until after the decision in 2005. Benitez was paroled and released to family sponsors, two days after his case was heard by the Supreme Court, October 15, 2004.

Daniel Benitez died March 29, 2005, just months after his case was decided in January, 2005. Sergio Suarez Martinez can be found as a registered sex offender, otherwise his whereabouts are unknown.

Implementation

With the decision of Clark v. Martinez, Mariel Cubans who have been under long term detention are to be released from custody.

References

External links
 

United States Supreme Court cases
United States immigration and naturalization case law
2005 in United States case law
Deportation from the United States
United States Supreme Court cases of the Rehnquist Court